A women's Twenty20 International (WT20I) is a 20 overs-per-side cricket match played in a maximum of 150 minutes between two ICC member sides, and is played under the rules of Twenty20 cricket. The first such match was held in August 2004 between England and New Zealand. The India women's national cricket team played its first WT20I against England in August 2006; India won the match by eight wickets. 

Since the team made its first WT20I appearance in 2006, 73 playersincluding five different captainshave represented India in the format. The list is arranged in the order in which each player won her first Twenty20 cap. Where more than one player won her first Twenty20 cap in the same match, those players are listed alphabetically by surname.

Key

List of players

Statistics are correct as of 23 February 2023.

WT20I captains

References

 
Cricket Women Twenty20
Cricketers
India